This is a shortened version of the ninth chapter of the ICD-9: Diseases of the Digestive System. It covers ICD codes 520 to 579. The full chapter can be found on pages 301 to 328 of Volume 1, which contains all (sub)categories of the ICD-9. Volume 2 is an alphabetical index of Volume 1. Both volumes can be downloaded for free from the website of the World Health Organization.

Diseases of oral cavity, salivary glands, and jaws (520–529)
  Disorders of tooth development and eruption
  Anodontia
  Supernumerary teeth
  Abnormalities of size and form of teeth
  Mottled teeth
  Disturbances of tooth formation
  Hereditary disturbances in tooth structure not elsewhere classified
  Disturbances in tooth eruption
  Teething syndrome
  Diseases of hard tissues of teeth
  Dental caries
  Excessive attrition
  Abrasion of teeth
  Erosion of teeth
  Pathological tooth resorption
  Hypercementosis
  Ankylosis of teeth
  Intrinsic posteruptive color changes of teeth
  Other specified diseases of hard tissues of teeth
  Cracked tooth
  Diseases of pulp and periapical tissues
  Gingival and periodontal diseases
  Gingivitis, chronic
  Dentofacial anomalies, including malocclusion
  Major anomalies of jaw size
  Major anomalies of jaw size maxillary hypoplasia
  Anomalies of relationship of jaw to cranial base
  Anomalies of dental arch relationship
  Anomalies of tooth position of fully erupted teeth
  Malocclusion unspecified
  Dentofacial functional abnormalities
  Temporomandibular joint disorders
  Dental alveolar anomalies
  Other specified dentofacial anomalies
  Other diseases and conditions of the teeth and supporting structures
  Diseases of the jaws
 Developmental odontogenic cysts
 Fissural cysts of jaw
 Other cysts of jaws
 Central giant cell (reparative) granuloma
 Inflammatory conditions of jaw
 Alveolitis of jaw
 Periradicular pathology associated with previous endodontic treatment
 Other specified diseases of the jaws
 Exostosis of jaw
  Diseases of the salivary glands
  Atrophy of salivary gland
  Hypertrophy of salivary gland
  Sialoadenitis
  Abscess of salivary gland
  Fistula of salivary gland
  Sialolithiasis
  Mucocele of salivary gland
  Disturbance of salivary secretion
  Diseases of the oral soft tissues, excluding lesions specific for gingiva and tongue
  Stomatitis
  Cancrum oris
  Aphthous ulcer, Oral aphthae
  Cellulitis and abscess of oral soft tissues
  Cysts of oral soft tissues
  Diseases of lips
  Leukoplakia of oral mucosa including tongue
  Leukoplakia, oral mucosa
  Other disturbances of oral epithelium including tongue
  Erythroplakia
  Oral submucosal fibrosis, including of tongue
  Other and unspecified diseases of the oral soft tissues
  Diseases and other conditions of the tongue
  Glossitis

Diseases of esophagus, stomach, and duodenum (530–539)
  Diseases of esophagus
  Achalasia/cardiospasm
  Esophagitis, unspec.
  Esophageal stricture/stenosis
  Other specified disorders of esophagus
  Gastroesophageal reflux, no esophagitis
  Barrett's esophagitis
  Gastric ulcer
  Duodenal ulcer
  Peptic ulcer, site unspecified
  Gastrojejunal ulcer
  Gastritis and duodenitis
  Acute gastritis
  Duodenitis
  Disorders of function of stomach
  Gastroparesis
  Dyspepsia
  Other disorders of stomach and duodenum
  Gastrointestinal mucositis (ulcerative)
  Complications of bariatric procedures

Appendicitis (540–543)
  Acute appendicitis
  Appendicitis, acute w/ gen. peritonitis
  Appendicitis, acute w/o peritonitis
  Appendicitis, unqualified
  Other appendicitis
  Other diseases of appendix

Hernia of abdominal cavity (550–553)
  Inguinal hernia
  Hernia, inguinal, NOS, unilateral
  Other hernia of abdominal cavity, with gangrene
  Other hernia of abdominal cavity with obstruction, without mention
  Other hernia of abdominal cavity without mention of obstruction
  Hernia, femoral, unilateral
  Hernia, umbilical
  Hernia, ventral, unspec.
  Hernia, ventral, incisional
  Hernia, hiatal, noncongenital
  Hernias, other, NOS

Noninfectious enteritis and colitis (555–558)
  Regional enteritis
  Crohn's, small intestine
  Crohn's, large intestine
  Crohn's disease, NOS
  Idiopathic proctocolitis
  Ulcerative colitis, unspec.
  Vascular insufficiency of intestine
  Vascular insufficiency, acute, intestine
  Ischemic bowel disease, unspec.
  Other noninfectious gastroenteritis and colitis
  Gastroenteritis, noninfectious, unspec.

Other diseases of intestines and peritoneum (560–569)
 , Intestinal obstruction without mention of hernia
 , Ileus
 , Impaction of intestine
 , Intestinal obstruction unspec
 , Diverticula of intestine
 , Diverticulosis of colon
 , Diverticulitis of colon, NOS
 , Diverticulosis colon w/ hemorrhage
 , Functional digestive disorders not elsewhere classified
 , Constipation unspec
 , Irritable bowel syndrome
 , Post-gastric-surgery syndromes
 , Postoperative functional disorders
 , Anal spasm
 , Anal fissure and fistula
 , Anal fissure nontraumatic
 , Abscess of anal and rectal regions
 , Abscess perianal
 , Peritonitis
 , Peritonitis in infectious diseases classified elsewhere
 , Pneumococcal peritonitis
 , Other suppurative peritonitis
 , Peritonitis (acute) generalized
 , Peritoneal abscess
 , Spontaneous bacterial peritonitis
 , Retroperitoneal infections
 , Psoas muscle abscess
 , Other disorders of peritoneum
 , Peritoneal adhesions
 , Other specified disorders of peritoneum
 Pneumoperitoneum
 , Other disorders of intestine
 , Bleeding rectal
 , Infection colostomy/enterostomy
 , Mechanical complication of ostomy
 , Angiodysplasia intestine w/ hemorrhage

Other diseases of digestive system (570–579)

Liver
  Acute and subacute necrosis of liver
  Hepatic failure, acute
  Chronic liver disease and cirrhosis
  Fatty liver, alcoholic
  Cirrhosis, liver, alcoholic
  Hepatitis, chronic, unspec.
  Cirrhosis, NOS
  Primary biliary cirrhosis
  Liver disease, chronic, unspec.
  Liver abscess and sequelae of chronic liver disease
  Coma, hepatic
  Hepatorenal syndrome
  Other disorders of liver
  Hepatitis, toxic

Gallbladder
  Cholelithiasis
  Choledocholithiasis
  Other disorders of gallbladder
  Cholecystitis, acute
  Gallbladder disease, unspec.

Other biliary tract
  Other disorders of biliary tract
  Postcholecystectomy syndrome
  Cholangitis
  Obstruction of bile duct
 Mirizzi's syndrome
  Perforation of bile duct
  Fistula of bile duct
  Spasm of sphincter of oddi

Other
  Diseases of pancreas
  Pancreatitis, acute
  Pancreatitis, chronic
  Pancreatic cyst, pseudocyst
  Gastrointestinal hemorrhage
  Hematemesis
  Blood in stool, melena
  Intestinal malabsorption
  Coeliac disease
  Tropical sprue
  Blind loop syndrome
  Other and unspecified postsurgical nonabsorption
 Short bowel syndrome
  Pancreatic steatorrhea
  Other specified intestinal malabsorption
 Protein losing enteropathy
  Unspecified intestinal malabsorption

International Classification of Diseases